The 2015–16 Maryland Terrapins women's basketball team represented the University of Maryland, College Park in 2015–16 NCAA Division I women's basketball season. The Terrapins, are led by fourteenth year head coach Brenda Frese and played their home games at the Xfinity Center. They were second year members of the Big Ten Conference. They finished the season 31–4, 16–2 in Big Ten play to win their second straight Big Ten regular season title. They were also champions of the Big Ten Women's tournament for second straight year and received an automatic to the NCAA women's basketball tournament where defeated Iona in the first round before getting upset by Washington in the second round.

Roster

Big Ten Championship 
Maryland and Michigan State met in the championship game of the Big Ten tournament. Michigan State ended the first quarter with a small two point lead, and retained the lead at the half. In the third quarter, the Terrapins went on an 11–0 run to take a lead they would not relinquish. Maryland ended up with a win 60–44, to win the Big Ten championship for the second consecutive year. Shatori Walker-Kimbrough was named the Big Ten tournament most outstanding player.

Schedule

|-
!colspan=9 style="background:#CE1126; color:#FFFFFF;"| Exhibition

|-
!colspan=9 style="background:#CE1126; color:#FFFFFF;"| Non-conference regular season

|-
!colspan=9 style="background:#CE1126; color:#FFFFFF;"| Big Ten regular season

|-
!colspan=9 style="background:#CE1126; color:#FFFFFF;"| Big Ten Women's tournament|-
!colspan=9 style="background:#CE1126; color:#FFFFFF;"| NCAA Women's tournament

Rankings

See also
2015–16 Maryland Terrapins men's basketball team

References

Maryland Terrapins women's basketball seasons
Maryland
Maryland
Maryland
Maryland